The 2019 Women's Euro Winners Cup was the fourth edition of the Women's Euro Winners Cup (WEWC), an annual continental beach soccer tournament for women's top-division European clubs. The championship is the sport's version of the UEFA Women's Champions League in association football.

Organised by Beach Soccer Worldwide (BSWW), the tournament was held in Nazaré, Portugal from 1 June till 9 June 2019, in tandem with the larger men's edition.

The event began with a round robin group stage. At its conclusion, the best teams progressed to the knockout stage, a series of single elimination games to determine the winners, starting with the Round of 16 and ending with the final. Consolation matches were also played to determine other final rankings.

WFC Zvezda of Russia were the defending champions, but were knocked out in round of 16 by AIS Playas de San Javier from Spain, ultimately finishing in 10th place. AIS Playas de San Javier went on to win their first title, beating Madrid CFF of Spain on penalties in the final.

Teams
20 teams entered the tournament.

Entrants
Key: H: Hosts \ TH: Title holders

Group stage
The group stage fixtures were announced on 6 May.

All times are local, WEST (UTC+1).

Group A

Group B

Group C

Group D

Group E

Group F

Knockout stage
The top three clubs from each group, plus the best fourth placed team advance to the Round of 16.

In the knockout stage, the clubs compete in single-elimination matches. Consolation matches are also played to determine the final rankings involving the clubs knocked out of each round of the knockout stage.

Top goalscorers
Players who scored at least 5 goals

14 goals

 Melissa Gomes ( Stade de Reims)

12 goals

 Carolina González ( AIS Playas de San Javier)

Final standings

See also
2019 Euro Winners Cup (men's edition)

References

External links
Women's Euro Winners Cup Nazaré 2019 , at Beach Soccer Worldwide
Women's Euro Winners Cup Nazaré 2019, at Beach Soccer Russia

Women's Euro Winners Cup
Euro
2019
2019 in beach soccer
Nazaré, Portugal
Women's Euro Winners Cup